Maharani Kanchan Prava Devi was a Queen of Tripura as the wife of Bir Bikram Kishore Debbarma, King of Tripura State. After her husband's death in 1947, she was regent of Tripura until it was merged with India in 1949.

Life

She was the daughter of Maharaja Yadvendra Singh. She married Bir Bikram Kishore Debbarma, King of Tripura State, who became king in 1923. 

In 1947, her spouse died. She took control over the princely state as regent over the Council of Regency that managed the Government under the minority of prince Kirit Bikram Manikya Bahadur Debbarma.

Her Dewan was A.B. Chatterjee. She played a pivotal role in rehabilitating refugees and victims of the violence associated with the partition of India in the state of Tripura.

In 1948, she was forced by the Indian Government to abolish the Council of Regency and take sole control as regent. 

She ruled Tripura overseeing the merger and incorporation into independent India. She was obliged by Indian pressure to sign the merger agreement on 9th September 1949. She stepped down as regent when the state was merged with India in 1949. 

She founded the MBB College in Agartala.

References

Regents of India
20th-century women rulers
Founders of Indian schools and colleges
People from Agartala
Indian women philanthropists
Indian philanthropists
20th-century Indian women politicians
20th-century Indian politicians
Women in Tripura politics